Botryostroma is a genus of fungi in the family Venturiaceae. This is a monotypic genus, containing the single species Botryostroma inaequale.

References

External links
Botryostroma at Index Fungorum

Venturiaceae
Monotypic Dothideomycetes genera